Björn Hornikel (born 6 May 1992) is a German swimmer. He competed in the 100 meter freestyle and 4x100 freestyle relay  event at the 2016 Summer Olympics.

In seasonal competition he achieved a 48.65s 100m freestyle result at the 128. Deutschen Meisterschaften in Berlin, qualifying to compete at the 2016 Rio de Janeiro Olympics in Brazil. In Rio, he swam a 49.62s 100m freestyle in his heat, and did not advance to the semi-finals.

References

External links
 

1992 births
Living people
German male swimmers
Olympic swimmers of Germany
Swimmers at the 2016 Summer Olympics
Place of birth missing (living people)
German male freestyle swimmers
People from Böblingen
Sportspeople from Stuttgart (region)